Dennison Thomas (born 3 March 1968) is a former Grenadian cricketer who represented the Windward Islands in West Indian domestic cricket. He played as a right-arm fast bowler.

Thomas represented the West Indies under-19s at the 1988 Youth World Cup in Australia, featuring in seven of his team's eight matches. He took eight wickets, including 2/18 against Pakistan, 2/22 against Sri Lanka, and 2/28 against England. However, Thomas did not make his first-class debut until over five years later, when he played a Red Stripe Cup game against Barbados. He would remain a regular for the Windward Islands throughout the rest of the 1990s, both at first-class level and in the regional limited-overs competition. In 20 first-class appearances for the Windwards, Thomas took 36 wickets, with his best figures, 4/42, coming against Jamaica in February 1996.

References

External links
Player profile and statistics at Cricket Archive
Player profile and statistics at ESPNcricinfo

1968 births
Living people
Grenadian cricketers
Windward Islands cricketers